Earl of Rochford was a title in the Peerage of England. It was created in 1695 and became extinct in 1830.

History
The title of Earl of Rochford was created in 1695 for William Nassau de Zuylestein, one of the most trusted companions of his kinsman, William of Orange. He was made Viscount Tunbridge at the same time, also in the Peerage of England. He was the son of Frederick Nassau de Zuylestein, natural son of Frederick Henry, Prince of Orange. Zuylestein was sent to England in 1687 and again in 1688 to report on the condition of affairs. In 1688 he sailed with the prince on his famous expedition. After the Revolution he was naturalized and served the king in the field, being raised to the English peerage in 1695. He was succeeded by his son William, the second Earl, who was killed at the Battle of Almenar, and then by another son, Frederick, the third Earl. Frederick's son, William Henry, the 4th Earl, was a diplomat and a statesman. Having gained experience as envoy at Turin from 1749 to 1753, he was Ambassador to Madrid from 1763 to 1766 and to Paris from 1766 to 1768. From 1768 to 1775 he was one of the secretaries of state. He left no children when he died on 28 September 1781, and was succeeded by his nephew, William Henry, the 5th Earl. The titles became extinct on the latter's death in September 1830. The estates of the Earls of Rochford were in Suffolk and Essex, their principal residence being St Osyth Priory in the latter county.

Earls of Rochford (1695)
William Nassau de Zuylestein, 1st Earl of Rochford (1649–1709)
William Nassau de Zuylestein, 2nd Earl of Rochford (1682–1710)
Frederick Nassau de Zuylestein, 3rd Earl of Rochford (1683–1738)
William Henry Nassau de Zuylestein, 4th Earl of Rochford (1717–1781)
William Henry Nassau de Zuylestein, 5th Earl of Rochford (1754–1830)

Arms
The earls of Rochford used the arms below, inherited via the founder of their Family Fredrick of Nassau, lord of Zuylestein, illegitimate son of Frederick Henry, Prince of Orange.

Family Tree

See also
Henry FitzJames, illegitimate son of James II, created Duke of Albemarle, together with the subsidiary titles of Earl of Rochford and Baron Romney, by his father on 13 January 1696.

References

External links

Extinct earldoms in the Peerage of England
Noble titles created in 1695
Extinct earldoms in the Jacobite Peerage
Noble titles created in 1696